The 1956 All-Ireland Junior Hurling Championship was the 35th staging of the All-Ireland Junior Championship since its establishment by the Gaelic Athletic Association in 1912.

Cork entered the championship as the defending champions, however, they were beaten by Tipperary in the Munster first round.

The All-Ireland final was played on 30 September 1956 at Eltham Stadium in London, between Kilkenny and London, in what was their first meeting in a final in five years. Kilkenny won the match by 5-02 to 2-08 to claim their fourth championship title overall and a first title since 1951.

Results

All-Ireland Junior Hurling Championship

All-Ireland semi-finals

All-Ireland home final

All-Ireland final

References

Junior
All-Ireland Junior Hurling Championship